State Correctional Institution – Forest is one of two identical correctional facilities in Pennsylvania that were constructed in the beginning of the twenty-first century to hold maximum-security male inmates. SCI Forest is located in the community of Marienville, in remote Forest County.

Creation of SCI-Forest
SCI - Forest and SCI-Fayette, which are identical in size and design, were constructed to accommodate overcrowding at SCI-Pittsburgh and SCI-Waynesburg, which were "mothballed" after the opening of SCI Forest. Construction of the correctional facility cost $126 million.

See also
 List of Pennsylvania state prisons

References

External links
  Penna. Department of Corrections - SCI Forest

Prisons in Pennsylvania
Buildings and structures in Forest County, Pennsylvania
2004  establishments in Pennsylvania